Phalonidia is a genus of moths belonging to the subfamily Tortricinae of the family Tortricidae.

Distribution
Phalonidia is found almost world-wide, except for the African and Australian regions. The genus is most diverse in the Neotropical and Palaearctic regions.

Species
Phalonidia acrota (Razowski, 1993)
Phalonidia aetheria (Razowski, 1967)
Phalonidia affinitana (Douglas, 1846)
Phalonidia alassosaccula (Razowski, 1997)
Phalonidia albertae (Razowski, 1997)
Phalonidia albicaput (Razowski & Becker, 2002)
Phalonidia albipalpana (Zeller, 1847)
Phalonidia aliena (Kuznetzov, 1966)
Phalonidia amasiana (Ragonot, 1894)
Phalonidia argyraspis (Razowski, 1984)
Phalonidia assensus (Razowski, 1967)
Phalonidia baccatana (Razowski & Wojtusiak, 2010)
Phalonidia basiochreana (Kearfott, 1907)
Phalonidia bassii (Razowski, 1999)
Phalonidia brevifasciaria (Y.H. Sun & H.H. Li, 2013)
Phalonidia brilhanteana (Razowski & Becker, 1983)
Phalonidia campicolana (Walsingham, 1879)
Phalonidia cerina (Razowski & Becker, 2007)
Phalonidia cermatia (Razowski & Becker, 2002)
Phalonidia charagmophora (Razowski, 1999)
Phalonidia chlaenites (Razowski & Becker, 2002)
Phalonidia chloridia (Razowski & Becker, 1994)
Phalonidia chlorolitha (Meyrick, 1931)
Phalonidia cholovalva (Razowski & Wojtusiak, 2006)
Phalonidia claudia (Razowski & Wojtusiak, 2006)
Phalonidia contractana (Zeller, 1847)
Phalonidia coreana (Byun & Li, 2006)
Phalonidia curvistrigana (Stainton, 1859)
Phalonidia dangi (Razowski, 1997)
Phalonidia decrepita (Razowski & Becker, 2002)
Phalonidia diamphidia (Clarke, 1968)
Phalonidia diaphona (Razowski & Becker, 1986)
Phalonidia docilis (Razowski & Becker, 2002)
Phalonidia dotica (Razowski, 1993)
Phalonidia droserantha (Razowski, 1970)
Phalonidia dyas (Razowski & Becker, 1983)
Phalonidia dysmorphia (Clarke, 1968)
Phalonidia dysodona (Caradja, 1916)
Phalonidia ecuadorensis (Razowski, 1967)
Phalonidia elderana (Kearfott, 1907)
Phalonidia electra (Razowski & Becker, 2002)
Phalonidia embaphion (Razowski, 1984)
Phalonidia fariasana (Razowski & Becker, 2007)
Phalonidia fatua (Razowski & Becker, 1983)
Phalonidia fraterna (Razowski, 1970)
Phalonidia fulvimixta (Filipjev, 1940)
Phalonidia gilvicomana (Zeller, 1847)
Phalonidia haesitans (Razowski & Becker, 1994)
Phalonidia hapalobursa (Razowski & Becker, 1986)
Phalonidia haplidia (Razowski, 1986)
Phalonidia holguina (Razowski & Becker, 2007)
Phalonidia horrens (Razowski & Becker, 1983)
Phalonidia hypagosocia (Razowski, 1993)
Phalonidia imitabilis (Razowski, 1997)
Phalonidia introrsa (Razowski, 1993)
Phalonidia jequieta (Razowski & Becker, 2002)
Phalonidia karsholti (Razowski, 1993)
Phalonidia kathetospina (Razowski, 1993)
Phalonidia lacistovalva (Razowski & Becker, 2002)
Phalonidia laetitia (Clarke, 1968)
Phalonidia latifasciana (Razowski, 1970)
Phalonidia latipunctana (Walsingham, 1879)
Phalonidia lepidana (Clemens, 1860)
Phalonidia linharesa (Razowski & Becker, 2007)
Phalonidia lochites (Razowski, 1993)
Phalonidia loipa (Razowski, 1994)
Phalonidia lojana (Razowski & Becker, 2002)
Phalonidia lydiae (Filipjev, 1940)
Phalonidia manniana (Fischer von Röslerstamm, 1839)
Phalonidia mayarina (Razowski & Becker, 2007)
Phalonidia meizobursa (Razowski & Becker, 1994)
Phalonidia melanothicta (Meyrick, 1927)
Phalonidia melletes (Razowski & Becker, 1994)
Phalonidia memoranda (Razowski, 1997)
Phalonidia mesomerista (Razowski, 1994)
Phalonidia mimohospes (Razowski & Becker, 1983)
Phalonidia monocera (Razowski & Becker, 2007)
Phalonidia nicotiana (Liu & Ge, 1991)
Phalonidia nonaxyra (Razowski, 1994)
Phalonidia ochracea (Razowski, 1967)
Phalonidia ochrimixtana (Zeller, 1877)
Phalonidia ochrochraon (Razowski & Becker, 2002)
Phalonidia olivana (Razowski, 1967)
Phalonidia olivogrisea (Razowski & Wojtusiak, 2010)
Phalonidia ontariana (Razowski, 1997)
Phalonidia paliki (Razowski & Becker, 1983)
Phalonidia parapellax (Razowski, 1999)
Phalonidia parvana (Kawabe, 1980)
Phalonidia pellax (Razowski & Becker, 1983)
Phalonidia phlebotoma (Razowski & Becker, 1994)
Phalonidia praemorsa (Razowski, 1993)
Phalonidia pruinosana (Zeller)
Phalonidia remissa (Razowski & Becker, 2007)
Phalonidia remota (Razowski & Becker, 1983)
Phalonidia rotundiventralis (Y.H. Sun & H.H. Li, 2013)
Phalonidia rufoatra (Razowski, 1992)
Phalonidia sarovalva (Razowski, 1993)
Phalonidia scabra (Liu & Ge, 1991)
Phalonidia scolopis (Razowski, 1993)
Phalonidia silvestris (Kuznetzov, 1966)
Phalonidia squalida (Razowski & Becker, 1983)
Phalonidia submissana (Zeller, 1877)
Phalonidia swammerdamiana (Zeller, 1877)
Phalonidia synucha (Razowski & Becker, 1986)
Phalonidia tarijana (Razowski & Wojtusiak, 2013)
Phalonidia tenuispiniformis (Ying-Hui Sun & H.H. Li, 2013)
Phalonidia thryptica (Razowski, 1994)
Phalonidia trabalea (Razowski & Becker, 1994)
Phalonidia udana (Guenée, 1845)
Phalonidia unguifera (Razowski, 1976)
Phalonidia vorticata (Meyrick, 1912)
Phalonidia walkerana (Razowski, 1967)
Phalonidia zygota (Razowski, 1964)
Platphalonidia assector (Razowski, 1967)
Platphalonidia californica (Razowski, 1986)
Platphalonidia dubia (Razowski & Becker, 1983)
Platphalonidia felix (Walsingham, 1895)
Platphalonidia fusifera (Meyrick, 1912)
Platphalonidia galbanea (Meyrick, 1917)
Platphalonidia lavana (Busck, 1907)
Platphalonidia luxata (Razowski & Becker, 1986)
Platphalonidia mendora (Clarke, 1968)
Platphalonidia mystica (Razowski & Becker, 1983)
Platphalonidia ochraceana (Razowski, 1967)
Platphalonidia paranae (Razowski & Becker, 1983)
Platphalonidia plicana (Walsingham, 1884)
Platphalonidia sublimis (Meyrick, 1917)
Platphalonidia subolivacea (Walsingham, 1897)
Platphalonidia tehuacana (Razowski, 1986)

Former species
Aethes mordax; formerly Phalonia mordax (Meyrick, 1917)
Aethesoides enclitica; formerly Phalonia enclitica (Meyrick, 1917)
Fulvoclysia dictyodana; formerly Phalonia acutana (Kennel, 1913)
Gynnidomorpha julianiensis; formerly Phalonidia julianiensis (Liu & Ge, 1991)
Gynnidomorpha mesotypa; formerly Phalonidia mesotypa (Razowski, 1970)
Gynnidomorpha stirodelphys; formerly Phalonidia stirodelphys (Diakonoff, 1976)
Lorita scarificata; formerly Phalonia scarificata (Meyrick, 1917)
Mourecochylis mimosina; formerly Platphalonidia mimosina (Razowski, 1986)
Mourecochylis stibeutes; formerly Platphalonidia stibeutes (Razowski, 1992)
Saphenista aculeata; formerly Phalonidia aculeata (Razowski, 1967)
Saphenista aeraria; formerly Phalonidia aeraria (Razowski, 1967)
Saphenista deliphrobursa; formerly Phalonidia deliphrobursa (Razowski, 1992)
Saphenista sphragidias; formerly Phalonia sphragidias (Meyrick, 1932)

See also
List of Tortricidae genera

References

 , 2005: World catalogue of insects volume 5 Tortricidae.
 , 1933, Amat. Papillons 6: 242
 , 1991: A study of the genus Phalonidia (Cochylidae) of China with descriptions of three new species. Sinozoologia 8: 349–358. Full article: .
  et al. 2012: DNA barcodes reveal that the widespread European tortricid moth Phalonidia manniana (Lepidoptera: Tortricidae) is a mixture of two species. Zootaxa, 3262: 1–21. Preview
 , 2011: Diagnoses and remarks on genera of Tortricidae, 2: Cochylini (Lepidoptera: Tortricidae). Shilap Revista de Lepidopterologia 39 (156): 397–414.
 , 2002: Systematic and faunistic data on Neotropical Cochylini (Lepidoptera: Tortricidae), with descriptions of new species. Part.1. Acta zool. cracov. 45: 287-316 
 , 2006: Tortricidae from Venezuela (Lepidoptera: Tortricidae). Shilap Revista de Lepidopterologia 34 (133): 35-79 
 , 2010: Tortricidae (Lepidoptera) from Peru. Acta Zoologica Cracoviensia 53B (1-2): 73-159. . Full article: .
 , 2013: Accessions to the fauna of Neotropical Tortricidae (Lepidoptera). Acta Zoologica Cracoviensia, 56 (1): 9-40. Full article: .
 , 2013: Taxonomic review of Chinese Phalonidia Le Marchand, 1933 (Lepidoptera: Tortricidae: Cochylini). Zootaxa 3641 (5): 533–553. Abstract:

External links
Tortricidae.com: List of Phalonidia

 
Cochylini
Tortricidae genera